Manoj Veerendra Hemaratne (born July 24, 1969, in Colombo) is a former Sri Lankan first-class cricketer who played for the Antonians Sports Club from 1985 to 2000. He was a right-handed batsman and right arm off break bowler.

Cricket career

He started his cricket career from St. Anthonys College Wattala in 1979 and he captained school under 13,15, 17 and first eleven cricket teams. Under his captaincy St. Anthonys College Wattala won the outstation best team BATA schoolboy cricketer awards in 1987. He also won the outstation best allrounder award and runner-up best fielder award. He scored more than 900 runs and captured more than 30 wickets in 1985/86 and 1986/87 seasons. He was in the Sri Lankan under-19 cricket pool and his pool mates were Sanath Jayasuriya, Romesh Kaluwitharana who played for the Sri Lankan national team.

He started his first class career in 1985 and he played for Kurunegala SC, Sarasans SC and finally Antonian Sport Club Wattala. He played some useful innings for his clubs and scored few centuries and fifties during his first class career. Major tournaments participated were SARA trophy, Bristol trophy, Lakspry Tyophy and Premier league organized by Sri Lanka cricket board. He was a member of Gampaha District cricket team. He also participated for domestic one day limited over cricket Matches.

From 2001 to 2003 he involved in cricket administration as a Cricket manager for Antonian SC and He is also an Antonian sc committee member.

He was involved in 2011 ICC world cup and 2012 T20 world cup which was held in Sri Lanka.

He was a liaison  officer to the South Africa emerging team.

External links
Cricinfo: Manoj Hemaratne
St. Anthony's college wattala: Manoj Hemaratne
connect explore: Manoj
cricket online: Manoj Hemaratne
cosmix: Manoj Hemarate

Sri Lankan cricketers
Antonians Sports Club cricketers
Living people
1969 births
Cricketers from Colombo